Bavarian cuisine is a style of cooking from Bavaria, Germany. Bavarian cuisine includes many meat and Knödel dishes, and often uses flour. Due to its rural conditions and cold climate, only crops such as beets and potatoes do well in Bavaria, being a staple in the German diet.

The Bavarian dukes, especially the Wittelsbach family, developed Bavarian cuisine and refined it to be presentable to the royal court. This cuisine has belonged to wealthy households, especially in cities, since the 19th century. The (old) Bavarian cuisine is closely connected to Czech cuisine and Austrian cuisine (especially from Tyrol and Salzburg), mainly through the families Wittelsbach and Habsburg. Already in the beginning, Bavarians were closely connected to their neighbours in Austria through linguistic, cultural and political similarities, which also reflected on the cuisine.

A characteristic Bavarian cuisine was further developed by both groups, with a distinct similarity to Franconian and Swabian cuisine. A Bavarian speciality is the Brotzeit, a savoury snack, which would originally be eaten between breakfast and lunch.

History
Cooking traditions of Bavarian cuisine date back to medieval times, where people brought different cuisines to Bavaria along with their conquerors, including Charlemagne.

Bratwurst (Nürnberger Bratwurst) was first mentioned in a document in 1313 when the council of Nuremberg described the recipe as a special product.

Beer was known to have been brewed since the Bronze Age. The ancient Germans were probably the first Europeans to have brewed beer. According to the Reinheitsgebot of 1516, introduced by Wilhelm IV, Duke of Bavaria, the only ingredients used to make beer included barley, hops and water, and including yeast. An earthenware amphora, discovered in a Celtic chieftain's burial mound in Kasendorf dates back to 800 BCE and considers to be the oldest evidence of beer-making in Europe.

There is rumour which has it that noodles were brought to Bavaria by Marco Polo, after returning from his journey in China while the Romans were gone.

The Napoleonic Wars marked the time with the occupation of Bavaria, the French influenced everything in their own way of life, mainly Haute cuisine.

Traditional dishes

Regional cuisine in the various states of the German nation has received increasing attention since the late 19th century, particularly that of the larger cities. In cookbooks of that era termed "Bavarian" both domestic rural dishes and dishes inspired by French cuisine were published. The cookbooks concentrated on dishes based on flour and Knödel. For the regular people, even the people living in cities, meat was usually only reserved for Sundays.

The 19th century cookbooks included many recipes for soups containing Knödel. The meat recipes were mostly based on beef and veal, where cooked beef was used for everyday meals. In the case of pork, suckling pig played a great role. "The use of offal and the entire slaughtered animal - especially the calf - from head to toe was a special characteristic of the recipes collected in the Bavarian cookbooks. Udders, tripe, calf head, calf hoofs, etc. have changed from 'poor man's dishes' [...] to the prestigious 'Schmankerl' of the new Bavarian regional cuisine. [...] The prominence of head cheese, prepared both sweet and sour, seems to also be a speciality of Bavarian cuisine."

Knödel and noodles were a traditional festive dish in Bavaria. In the late 19th century, chopped pork with Knödel was a typical Bavarian regional dish. The Munich Weißwurst was "invented" only in 1857. There were few recipes for mixed vegetables in the cookbooks, and stews played hardly any role, but the Pichelsteiner stew is said to be introduced in Eastern Bavaria in 1847. In the 19th century, the vegetables that most of the Bavarians usually ate were Sauerkraut and beets. French-influenced dishes included Ragouts, Fricassee and "Böfflamott" (Boeuf à la Mode), larded and marinated beef. This was mostly only reserved for the nobility, but was later also adopted into the cuisine of ordinary people.

A report from 1860 says: "A characteristic of the nurture of the Upper Bavarian rural people is the overall prominence of flour, milk and lard dishes with vegetables added and the diminished consumption of meat dishes on the five most important festive days of the year: Carnival, Easter, Pentecost, Kermesse and Christmas [...]".

Munich cuisine

The everyday cuisine of the citizens of the state capital Munich differed somewhat from that of the rural people, especially by the greater consumption of meat. In the city, more people could afford beef, and on festival days, roast veal was preferred. From 1840 to 1841, with Munich having a population of about 83,000 citizens, a total of 76,979 calves were slaughtered, statistically approximately one calf per citizen. The number of slaughtered cows was about 20,000. Bratwursts of beef were especially popular. In the 19th century, potatoes were also accepted as part of Bavarian cuisine, but they could still not replace the popularity of Dampfnudel.

A main reason for the preference for veal in Munich was the striking lack of space in town, allowing for smaller animals only. With its preserved, near-medieval grid of narrow lanes and streets and similarly narrow, half-gabled houses, including run-through staircases without landings called Himmelsleiter (Jacob's ladder), most people could only afford to keep two pieces or so of small framed livestock in ground floor crates at the rear ends of their houses. Calves reaching heifer size, nearing maturity, would consequently either have had to be slaughtered or to be sold out of town.

The typical meat-oriented Munich cuisine was not always accepted by others. One author wrote about Munich in a 1907 publication: "The 'Munich cuisine' is based on the main concept of the 'eternal calf'. In no other city in the world is so much veal consumed as in Munich … Even breakfast consists mainly of veal in all possible forms … mostly sausages and calf viscus! … The dinner and evening meal consist only of all sorts of veal … And still the Munich innkeepers speak of a 'substantial selection of dishes' without realising that the one-sidedness of the 'Munich veal cuisine' cannot be surpassed any more!"

List of dishes

Appetisers
 Griebenschmalz

Soups

 Bread soup
 Chanterelle soup with Semmelknödel
 Eintopf
 Griessnockerlsuppe (Semolina Dumplings Soup)
 Semolina Knödel soup
 Hochzeitssuppe
 Leberknödelsuppe Liver dumpling soup
 Liver Spätzle soup
 Pancake soup
 Sauerne Suppn ("sour soup", a soup made of hardened milk)
 Bacon Knödel soup

Main courses

 Saures Lüngerl
 Roast pork with potato Knödel or Semmelknödel
 Surbraten, roasted cured pork or Haxe
 Krustenbraten
 Tellerfleisch
 Schweinsbraten – A traditional Bavarian roast pork dish that is common in upper Bavaria
 Schweinshaxe
 Sauerbraten
 Skirt steak
 Pichelsteiner
 Kalbsvögerl
 Kesselfleisch
 Reiberdatschi
 Fingernudeln
 Schupfnudeln
 Schmalznudeln
 Rohrnudeln
 Schuxen
 Bröselschmarrn
 Fleischpflanzerl
 Cabbage rolls
 Suckling pig
 Bröselbart
 Gnocchi
 Käsespätzle

Snacks

 Pretzels
 Kartoffelkäse
 Obatzda

Delicacies

 Apfelkücherl
 Bratapfel
 Dampfnudel
 Kaiserschmarrn
 Germknödel
 Magenbrot
 Gebrannte Mandeln

Desserts
 Apfelstrudel
 Bavarian cream
 Baumkuchen
 Coffee and cake (kaffee und kuchen)
 Dampfnudeln – a steamed dumpling with a sweet fruit sauce
 French toast (Armer Ritter; [lit.] "Poor Knight") 
 Bienenstich
 Gugelhupf
 Schwarzwälder Kirschtorte
 Prinzregententorte
 Topfenstrudel
 Milchrahmstrudel (Millirahmstrudel)
 Zwetschgendatschi

Sausages and meat dishes

Most Bavarian sausages are produced using pork.
 Head cheese
 Weißwurst with sweet mustard
 Black pudding
 Bierwurst
 Gelbwurst
 Milzwurst
 Wollwurst
 Stockwurst
 Regensburger Wurst
 Leberkäse
 Wiener Würstchen

Salads

 Bavarian potato salad
 Potato and cucumber salad
 Bavarian Wurstsalat
 Coleslaw
 Sour Knödel

Specialties

Bavaria

 Allerseelenzopf
 Auszogne
 Bayrisch Kraut
 Red cabbage
 Bavarian blue cheese
 Bauernseufzer
 Pretzels
 Böfflamott ("Boeuf à la mode")
 Kartoffelkäse
 Hopfenspargel
 Fried dough foods
 Horseradish
 Leberkäse
 Munich onion meat
 Sauerkraut
 Obatzda
 Asparagus
 Gwixte
 Head cheese
 Raphanus
 Black-smoked ham
 Steckerlfisch
 Weisswurst

Bavarian Swabia
 Brenntar
 Cheese spätzle
 Onion bratwurst
 Bergkäse
 Schupfnudel

Franconia

 Nuremberg bratwurst
 Nuremberg lebkuchen
 Franconian zwiebelkuchen
 Franconian wood oven bread
 Fruitcake
 Schlachtschüssel
 Saure Zipfel
 Schneeballen
 Schäufele

Drinks
 Wheat beer
 Pale lager
 Radler
 Märzen
 Bock
 Spezi
 Shandy
 Bärwurzschnaps
 Blutwurzschnaps
 Enzianschnaps
 Obstler
 Franconian wine

Yiddish Bavarian cuisine

There is also a subdivision of Bavarian cuisine, named Yiddish Bavarian cuisine, which includes dishes like:
 Keizershmorrn
 Emmental cheese

Further reading

References

External links

 
Cuisine